Plaidy railway station was a railway station at Plaidy, Aberdeenshire, Scotland on the rural branchline to Macduff. It was opened in 1860 by the Banff, Macduff and Turriff Junction Railway and closed in 1944.

History
One of the stationmasters or agents, as the GNoSR referred to them, was James Minto. James transferred to the larger station at Auchterless. At first most trains called at Plaidy. The station and goods yard were closed by the LNER on the 22 May 1944, but the line remained open until 1961.

Infrastructure
The station was on a single track section of line without a crossing loop or signalbox. A goods yard was present with two sidings, loading platforms, a weighing machine and several small buildings. The single platform lay on the west side of the line and a simple shelter was present. A likely stationmaster's house and other railway related buildings were located nearby. An overbridge lay nearby on the route to Macduff that has now been demolished.

The site today
The goods yard buildings and platform were demolished and the site is now occupied by a private dwelling.

References

Notes

Sources 
 
 
 McLeish, Duncan (2014). Rails to Banff, Macduff and Oldmeldrum. Pub. GNoSRA. .

Disused railway stations in Aberdeenshire
Former Great North of Scotland Railway stations
Railway stations in Great Britain opened in 1860
Railway stations in Great Britain closed in 1944
1857 establishments in Scotland
1944 disestablishments in Scotland